MCZ may refer to:

 Marine Conservation Zone,  type of marine nature reserve in UK waters
 Martin County Airport, North Carolina, USA
 Momoiro Clover Z, Japanese girl group
 Museum of Comparative Zoology, Harvard University, Massachusetts, USA
 Zumbi dos Palmares International Airport, Maceió, Brazil (IATA code)
 The former ticker symbol for Mad Catz